John Westcott (born 31 May 1979) is an English retired professional footballer.

Biography
Westcott began his career playing for Brighton & Hove Albion in the Football League, before playing non-league football for Eastbourne Borough, Horsham, Tonbridge Angels, Horsham YMCA, and Redhill.

In April 2021, he was awarded man of the match for Sands United Brighton and Hove after scoring a 40-yard screamer vs Sussex Dynamos.

Honours

Eastbourne Borough (2000–2004)
Southern League: Eastern Division Runners Up: 2002–03

Horsham (2004–2007)
Isthmian League Division One Runners-up: 2005–06

References

External links

1979 births
Living people
Sportspeople from Eastbourne
English footballers
Association football wingers
Brighton & Hove Albion F.C. players
Newport (IOW) F.C. players
Sutton United F.C. players
Eastbourne Borough F.C. players
Horsham F.C. players
Tonbridge Angels F.C. players
Horsham YMCA F.C. players
Redhill F.C. players
English Football League players
Southern Football League players
Isthmian League players